Callidium cicatricosum is a species of beetle, also referred to as the long-horned beetle, in the family Cerambycidae. It was described by Mannerheim in 1853.

References

Callidium
Beetles described in 1853